The 1880 Rutgers Queensmen football team represented Rutgers University as an independent during the 1880 college football season. The team compiled a 2–2 record and was outscored by opponents 12 to 6. The team had no coach, and its captain was John Morrison.

Schedule

References

Rutgers
Rutgers Scarlet Knights football seasons
Rutgers Queensmen football